"Rip Rip Woodchip" is a song by Australian country singer John Williamson. The song was released in August 1989 as the second single from Williamson's eighth studio album Warragul. The song peaked at number 39 on the ARIA Charts. $1 from each sale went towards the Australian Conservation Foundation.

At the 1990 APRA Awards (Australia), the song won Most Performed Australasian Country Work.

In 1995, the logging industry  threatened to sue Williamson over the song. Williamson said "People say I'm a green, but I'm not. It's just how I feel and if you don't like it, too bad. I became a conservationist in 1980 when I woke up to it. I left farming in part because I'm so into trees. I think an old growth forest is more important than the Sydney Town Hall. Surely that heritage is more important than the other? Surely?"

Track listing

Charts

Release history

References 

John Williamson (singer) songs
1989 songs
1989 singles
APRA Award winners
Environmental songs
Festival Records singles